Moane is a village in Øystre Slidre Municipality in Innlandet county, Norway. The village is located on the east side of the river Volbuelve, on a hillside between the lakes Heggefjorden and Volbufjorden. The Norwegian County Road 51 runs through the village.

References

Øystre Slidre
Villages in Innlandet